Gilberto Rafael Serrano (born March 19, 1970) is a Venezuelan former professional boxer. Serrano is most notable for having won the WBA World lightweight title during his career, which spanned from 1993 to 2004. He won the Lightweight title from Stefano Zoff in 1999 after unsuccessfully challenging Yong Soo Choi for the WBA World super featherweight title in 1998. He retained the title in his first defence after stopping Hiroyuki Sakamoto in the fifth round. However, in his next fight he lost his title to Takanori Hatakeyama via an eighth round knockout. Serrano fought for a final time on November 15, 2004, beating Luis Cardozo by a unanimous decision.

Professional boxing record

References

External links

|-

Living people
Lightweight boxers
World Boxing Association champions
1970 births
Venezuelan male boxers